Gaydzak Nicosia was a Cypriot football club based in Nicosia. Founded in 1957, was playing sometimes in Second Division.

References

Defunct football clubs in Cyprus
Association football clubs established in 1957
1957 establishments in Cyprus